Nasjonal Samling (NS) was a Norwegian far-right political party active from 1933 to 1945. It was the only legal party of Norway from 1942 to 1945. It was founded by former minister of defence Vidkun Quisling and a group of supporters such as Johan Bernhard Hjortwho led the party's paramilitary wing (Hirden) for a short time before leaving the party in 1937 after various internal conflicts. The party celebrated its founding on 17 May, Norway's national holiday, but was founded on 13 May 1933.

History

Pre-war politics 

The party never gained direct political influence, but it made its mark on Norwegian politics nonetheless. Despite the fact that it never managed to get more than 2.5% of the vote and failed to elect even one candidate to the Storting, it became a factor by polarising the political scene. The established parties in Norway viewed it as a Norwegian version of the German Nazis, and generally refused to cooperate with it in any way. Several of its marches and rallies before the war were either banned, or marred by violence when communists and socialists clashed with the Hird.

A significant trait of the party throughout its existence was a relatively high level of internal conflict. Antisemitism, anti-Masonry and differing views on religion, as well as the party's association with the Nazis and Germany, were hotly debated, and factionalized the party. By the time the Second World War broke out, the party had around 2,000 members.

Strong belief in Romantic nationalism and authoritarianism dominated the NS ideology. It also relied heavily on Nordic symbolism in its propaganda and speeches. It asserted that its symbol (shown at the head of this article), a golden sun cross on a red background (colours of the coat of arms of Norway), had been the symbol of St. Olaf, painted on his shield.

During the German occupation 
When Germany invaded Norway in April 1940, Quisling marched into the Norwegian Broadcasting Corporation studios in Oslo and made a radio broadcast proclaiming himself Prime Minister and ordering all anti-German resistance to end immediately. However, King Haakon VII, in unoccupied territory along with the Nygaardsvold government, let it be known he would abdicate rather than appoint any government headed by Quisling. The Nygaardsvold government refused to step down in Quisling's favour and confirmed that resistance was to be continued. With no popular support, the German forces of occupation quickly thrust Quisling aside. In December 1940 membership rose to 22,000, and peaked with around 44,000 in November 1943.

After a brief period with a civilian caretaker government (Administrasjonsrådet) appointed by the Supreme Court, the Germans took control through Reichskommissar Josef Terboven. He appointed a government responsible to himself, with most ministers from the ranks of Nasjonal Samling. However, the party leader, Quisling, was controversial in Norway as well as among the occupiers, and was denied a formal position until 1 February 1942, when he became "minister president" of the "national government". Other important ministers were Jonas Lie (also head of the Norwegian wing of the SS from 1941) as minister of police, Gulbrand Lunde as minister of "popular enlightenment and propaganda", and the opera singer Albert Viljam Hagelin, who was Minister of Home Affairs. The NS administration had a certain amount of autonomy in purely civilian matters, but it was in reality controlled by Reichskommissar Terboven as "head of state", subordinate only to Adolf Hitler.

Post-war 
The post-war authorities proscribed the party and prosecuted its members as collaborators. Nearly 50,000 were brought to trial, approximately half of whom received prison sentences. The authorities executed Quisling for treason as well as a few other high-profile NS members, and prominent German officials in Norway, for war crimes. The sentences' lawfulness has been questioned, however, as Norway did not have capital punishment in peace-time, and the Norwegian constitution at the time stipulated that capital punishment for war crimes had to be carried out during actual wartime.

Another issue of post-war treatment has been the ongoing Hamsun debate in Norway. The internationally renowned author Knut Hamsun, although never a member, was a well-known NS sympathiser. After the war, Hamsun was, however, deemed mentally unfit to stand trial, and the issue of his links to the party has never been properly resolved. Hamsun's status as a Nobel Prize laureate also results in his ties to NS being a sensitive subject.

Uniforms and insignia

Parliamentary elections

References

Further reading
 Larsen, Stein Ugelvik.  "Charisma from Below? The Quisling Case in Norway." Totalitarian Movements and Political Religions 7#2 (2006): 235–244.
 Larsen, Stein Ugelvik, "The Social Foundations of Norwegian Fascism 1933–1945: An Analysis of Membership Data" in Stein Ugelvik Larsen, Bernt Hagtvet, and Jan Petter Myklebust, eds. Who were the fascists: social roots of European fascism (Columbia University Press, 1980).
 
 
 Hamre, Martin Kristoffer, "Norwegian Fascism in a Transnational Perspective: The Influence of German National Socialism and Italian Fascism on the Nasjonal Samling, 1933–1936", Fascism 2019 8 (1), 36–60.

 
1933 establishments in Norway
1945 disestablishments in Norway
Banned far-right parties
Defunct political parties in Norway
Far-right political parties in Norway
Nazi parties
Anti-communist parties
Nationalist parties in Norway
Parties of one-party systems
Political parties established in 1933
Political parties disestablished in 1945
Vidkun Quisling
Norwegian Republicanism
Collaboration with Nazi Germany